The North Carolina Utilities Commission is a government agency that regulates the various utilities of the state of North Carolina.  The Commission also regulates household goods transportation, buses, brokers and ferryboats.

The Commission consists of seven members, including the chair of the Commission. The current chair is Charlotte A. Mitchell, who was named chair on in 2017.

History 
In 1891 the North Carolina General Assembly created the Railroad Commission to regulate the rates charged by railways, passenger boat services, telegraph services, and express companies. In 1893 the commission gained jurisdiction over telephone companies, and four years later it regulated street cars. In 1899 the Railroad Commission was replaced by the Corporation Commission, which assumed regulatory responsibility for the previous utilities as well as banks and savings and loan associations. Shortly thereafter the body was given some taxation responsibilities. Beginning in 1905, some of its duties were reassigned to new agencies. In 1913 the Corporation Commission was given responsibility for regulating water and hydroelectric utilities. In 1920 the commission was replaced by a single Utilities Commissioner and some part-time staff.

In 1941 the General Assembly created the North Carolina Utilities Commission, composed of three commissioners serving six-year terms. Two additional members and technical staff were added in 1949. In 1975 the board was expanded from five to seven members. Two years later the General Assembly created the Public Staff of the Utilities Commission to supply it with technical advice.

Powers and responsibilities 
The Utilities Commission regulates electric companies, telephone companies, natural gas companies, water and sewer utilities, moving companies, buses, brokers, and ferry lines in the state of North Carolina. It is empowered by state law to make rules and establish utility rates. It is required to publish two annual reports every year, one summarizing the legal and economic state of utilities in North Carolina and the other listing all of its rulings. The commissioners can hold hearings to gather testimony and evidence and have the same authority as the North Carolina Superior Court in compelling witnesses to testify or produce documentary evidence.

Structure 
The Utilities Commission is led by seven commissioners. Each are appointed by the governor to a six-year term and confirmed by the General Assembly. The governor also names one of the commissioners to chair the body. The chair serves as the chief executive of the agency and is an ex officio member of the Agency for Public Telecommunications Board and the Geographic Information Coordinating Council. For the purpose of official meetings and decisions, a majority of the commissioners constitutes a quorum. Hearings are often conducted by panels of three commissioners. The commissioners are by law bound to the same standards of conduct as judges in the state.

The commission is headquartered in the Dobbs Building in Raleigh. It employs about 71 staffers in four divisions: Legal & Administration, Operations, Clerk & IT Services, and Fiscal Management. The Public Staff of the Utilities Commission is an independent agency over which the commissioners exercise no control. Led by an exectuvie director appointed by the governor, it advises the commission on the appropriateness of rates charged and quality of service delivered by utilities.

Current commissioners 
The current commissioners are:

See also

Government of North Carolina

References

External links
 Public Staff - North Carolina Utilities Commission Website

North Carolina
State agencies of North Carolina
Government of North Carolina